Ali Aydar is an American computer scientist and Internet entrepreneur.  He is the chief executive officer at Sporcle.

He is best known as an early employee and key technical contributor at the original Napster, the file-sharing service created by Shawn Fanning in 1999, and at SNOCAP, the digital rights and content management startup Fanning founded after Napster.  He was also chief operating officer of imeem, which acquired SNOCAP in 2008.

Early life
Ali Aydar was born to a Turkish family in Richmond, Virginia, and grew up in Napoleon, Michigan.  In high school, he ran a bulletin board system by the name of Awesome Fred's BBS. After high school, he attended Carnegie Mellon University, where he majored in mathematics and computer science. While there, Aydar was a contributor to the Free Internet Chess Server, an open-source project that enabled people to play online chess for free. This experience led to Aydar co-founding online chess startup chess.net with John Fanning, the uncle of Napster creator Shawn Fanning, in 1996.

Career
While working at chess.net, Aydar first met Fanning's then 15-year-old nephew, Shawn. In All the Rave, Joseph Menn notes that Shawn interned for chess.net in the summer of 1997, sleeping on a couch in the living room. That summer, Aydar and the other chess.net employees became close with the younger Fanning, who was just learning computer programming. Aydar bought Fanning his first book on programming in C++, the language he would use two years later to build the Napster file-sharing software.

Napster
After leaving chess.net, Aydar moved to Chicago, where he worked as a banker. In late 1998, Shawn Fanning contacted Aydar via instant messenger to tell him about a software application he was writing that would enable people to share music. Fanning was then a freshman at Northeastern University.

In August 1999, Aydar moved to California's Silicon Valley to work for a startup. Within weeks, he was recruited to join Napster. He joined in September 1999, becoming its first non-founding employee.

Initially, Aydar was an individual contributor to Napster's engineering team. Eventually, he moved into a management role as Napster's senior director of technology, where he was responsible for managing the development of Napster's next-generation legal service.

Aydar authored Napster's search engine software, which supported the millions of search queries Napster users made every day. At that time, Napster was the fastest-growing application in the history of the Internet; at its peak, the service had over 85 million registered users and 2 million simultaneous users around the world. Aydar's server software infrastructure successfully scaled to handle the exponential increase in Napster search queries, helping support Napster's unprecedented growth.

Following Napster's shutdown and subsequent bankruptcy, Aydar served as an advisor to the management team of software company Roxio during its 2003 acquisition of music service Pressplay.

SNOCAP
In June 2003, Aydar joined Shawn Fanning, Jordan Mendelson and Ron Conway at SNOCAP, the digital rights and content management startup Fanning founded after Napster's collapse. A significant number of its employees were people who had worked for Napster; an August 2005 profile in Time magazine noted that "27% of SNOCAP's employees are Napster veterans."

Aydar served as SNOCAP's chief operating officer from the company's inception through its acquisition by imeem in 2008, and for a year also served as its interim CEO. He co-invented SNOCAP's digital registry and MyStore technologies.  While at SNOCAP, he also completed an MBA from the Walter A. Haas School of Business at the University of California, Berkeley, on a part-time basis.

imeem
Aydar joined imeem as part of its acquisition of SNOCAP in April 2008, and served as the company's chief operating officer. He was an early advisor to imeem, serving on its board of directors from 2003 until 2007.  imeem was acquired by MySpace in December 2009.

Sporcle
Aydar serves as CEO of Sporcle.

References

External links
MP3.com Q&A with SNOCAP COO, Ali Aydar
Newsweek: YouTube's Copyright Crackdown: includes quotes from Aydar and discusses SNOCAP's technology
San Francisco Chronicle article about SNOCAP's launch
The Hook article on SNOCAP: "Never Mind the iTunes, It's Snocap"
Written Testimony of Ali Aydar, COO, SNOCAP, Inc., Before the U.S. Senate's Judiciary Committee, 9/28/05
Greenfeld, Karl Taro (2 October 2000). "Meet the Napster". Time. preview
Newsweek: The Noisy War Over Napster (June 2000 cover story on Shawn Fanning & Napster

 Haas School of Business alumni
 Carnegie Mellon University alumni
 Living people
 American technology chief executives
 American chief operating officers
 People from Richmond, Virginia
 American people of Turkish descent
 Year of birth missing (living people)